Paul Rosenmöller (born 11 May 1956) is a Dutch television presenter, politician, and former trade unionist. Between 1989 and 2003, he was member of the Dutch House of Representatives for GroenLinks ('GreenLeft') and was party leader from 1994. Since June 2019 he is a member of the Senate for GroenLinks.

Biography
Rosenmöller was born in Den Helder in 1956; his father was CEO of Vroom & Dreesmann. After finishing atheneum-b in Haarlem in 1974, Rosenmöller studied sociology. During his study Rosenmöller became associated with radical socialist, maoist groups. He stopped studying in 1978 to work in the harbour of Rotterdam.  He worked for the shipping company Müller Thomson. In 1985 he became a member of the board of the Transportation branch of the Rotterdam FNV labour union. He negotiated with VNO-NCW and is spokesperson during several strikes. Rosenmöller got national fame because of his radical position in these negotiations and strikes. He was a member of Group of Marxist-Leninists/Red Dawn (GML) from 1976 to 1982. The GML wanted to establish a communist state in the Netherlands and sympathized with several communist regimes, such as the People's Republic of China, the People's Socialist Republic of Albania and the Khmer Rouge from Cambodia. Rosenmöller was criticized about 20 years later because of his past with this organisation. The human right abuses by these regimes were often cited by critics.

Member of Parliament
In 1989, he became member of the newly founded party GroenLinks. GroenLinks was formed by four other parties, but Rosenmöller joined as an independent. In the 1989 election, he was the sixth on the list of the GroenLinks and the first independent; he was narrowly elected to the House of Representatives. In 1993 he was candidate party leader together with Leonie Sipkes, but they lost the internal elections to Mohammed Rabbae and Ina Brouwer. After the defeat of the GroenLinks in the 1994 election, Rosenmöller became the party leader.

As party leader he provided opposition against the first and second cabinets of Wim Kok. In 2002, however, the political climate had changed. Rosenmöller participated in the opposition against the rise of Pim Fortuyn. At a party congress, he described Fortuyn's political position as "not just right but extreme right". He lost the 2002 elections after the death of Fortuyn. In the hardened political climate after the murder of Fortuyn, serious threats against Rosenmöller's life and family were made. Because of this, Rosenmöller left politics. His successor as leader of the GroenLinks party was Femke Halsema.

As member of parliament, Rosenmöller showed interest in the situation of the Netherlands Antilles and social participation of immigrants.

Television 
In 2003, after leaving politics, Rosenmöller became a TV presenter for the IKON, which was an ecumenical broadcasting organisation. He also chairs  (PAVEM), a government advisory committee on the position of migrant women, in which Princess Máxima has a seat.

Personal life
Paul Rosenmöller is married and has five children.

References

1956 births
Living people
Dutch communists
Dutch television presenters
Dutch trade unionists
Dutch people of German descent
GroenLinks politicians
Members of the House of Representatives (Netherlands)
Leaders of GroenLinks
People from Den Helder
20th-century Dutch politicians
21st-century Dutch politicians